Sarasvàti Productions, often stylized Sarasvati Productions, was a Canadian feminist theatre company. Sarasvati hosts several annual events including the International Women's Week Cabaret of Monologues, One Night Stand, and FemFest.

History 
Sarasvati Productions was founded in 1998 in Toronto and permanently relocated to Winnipeg in 2000. The company was founded by Hope McIntyre who named it after the Hindu goddess, Saraswati.

In 2003, Sarasvati launched their International Women's Week Cabaret of Monologues. The cabaret features monologues from local artists pertaining to the annual theme. In 2008, the Cabaret of Monologues expanded to include touring across Manitoba. In 2017, Sarasvati relaunched their One Night Stand series. One Night Stand features ten-minute snippets from plays written by local playwrights.

In 2020, McIntyre stepped down as artistic director and Frances Koncan was appointed the incoming artistic director. Koncan resigned in March 2021. In 2023, the Board of Directors announced the closure of the company.

FemFest 
FemFest was founded in 2003. The Winnipeg Free Press described FemFest as "Canada’s main festival for female playwrights". FemFest is a two-week festival that features plays and readings from female playwrights from Manitoba and around the world.

The festival also features the annual Bake Off competition, in partnership with the Manitoba Association of Playwrights. Bake Off launched in 2012 and features several local playwrights who create ten-minute scenes with a surprise set of three "ingredients". The playwrights are given eight hours to write their scenes. The winning playwright receives dramaturgical assistance to develop their scene into a full play which will then receive a staged reading at the next FemFest.

FemFest celebrated its 10th anniversary in 2012 from September 15 to 22. The theme of this iteration of the festival was "Staging Identity". This FemFest was decidedly national and featured artists from Vancouver, Toronto, and Montreal in addition to Winnipeg-based artists. As part of the 2017 FemFest, Sarasvati collaborated with the Winnipeg Public Library to create a Human Library, partially inspired by Denmark's Human Library. The "library" featured 24 human books.

Select production history 
Sarasvati generally produces only one main-stage show per year in addition to its programming with FemFest, the Cabaret of Monologues, and One Night Stand.

 Hunger by Hope McIntyre (1998)
 Revisioning by Hope McIntyre (1999)
 Missiah by Hope McIntyre (2000)
 Death of Love by Hope McIntyre (2001)
 Fire Visions: Poems by Bertolt Brecht (2002)
 One for the Road by Harold Pinter (2003)
 You Whore (2003) - collective creation, performed at the Winnipeg Fringe Festival
 Jill's War by Victoria Loa Hicks and Nancy Kruh (2004) - performed at the Winnipeg Fringe Festival
 Impromptu of Outremont by Michel Tremblay (2005)
 Ripple Effect by Hope McIntyre (2008) - touring production at various Manitoba high schools
 Bone Cage by Catherine Banks (2009) - reading, part of Carol Shields Festival of New Works
 Fen by Caryl Churchill (2010)
 Eden by Hope McIntyre (2012) - directed by Sharon Bajer
 Jail Baby by Hope McIntyre and Cairn Moore with Nan Fewchuk and Marsha Knight (2013) - directed by Ann Hodges
 Fefu and Her Friends by María Irene Fornés (2014) - directed by Hope McIntyre
 Giving Voice (2014) - created with VOICES: Manitoba's Youth in Care Network, touring production at Manitoba high schools
 Miss N Me by Catherine Banks (2015) - directed by Hope McIntyre

 Shattered (2016)
 Breaking Through (2017) - directed by Kevin Klassen
 New Beginnings (2018) - directed by Cherissa Richards

FemFest productions 
2020: "Engaging Community"

 Alice and The World We Live In by Alexandria Haber
 Monstrous by Sarah Waisvisz (livestream only)

2019: "All the World’s a Stage"

Like Mother Like Daughter - directed by Rose Plotek
To Kill A Lizard by The Launchpad Project
Raising Stanley / Life with Tulia by Kim Patrick - directed by Bronwyn Steinberg
4inXchange - organized by xLq
Baby Box by Eva Barrie, Miranda Calderon, and Michelle Polak - directed by Hope McIntyre

2018: "Staging Resistance"

 Sound of the Beast by Donna-Michelle St. Bernard
 Burnt by Norah Paton
 White Man’s Indian by Darla Contois
 The Game by Manohar Performing Arts of Canada

2017: "Coming of Age"

 Tomboy Survival Guide by Ivan Coyote
 Two Indians by Falen Johnson

2016: "Transformation"

 Morro and Jasp Do Puberty by Heather Marie Annis and Amy Lee
 Miss Understood by Antonette Rea
 The Seduction Theory by Sherry MacDonald
 Mouthpiece by Norah Sadava and Amy Nostbakken

2015: "Hear Her Roar"

 The Dance-Off of Unconscious Coupling  by Frances Koncan
 The National Elevator Project

2014: "She’s Got the Power"

 The Naked Woman by Rebecca Gibson
 Launched by Tyler White
 Skin Deep by Alison Mclean - reading
 German Silver by Priscilla Yakielashek - reading
 8 Ways My Mother Was Conceived by Michaela Di Cesare
 Herewithal: A Paranormal Comedy by Jim and Tara Travis
 River Story by Rubena Sinha

2010: "On the Edge"

 she by d’bi young.anitafrica

2007: "We've Come a Long Way"

The Dance of Sara Wiens by Joy Eidse

References 

Feminist theatre
Women in theatre
1998 establishments in Canada
Theatre festivals in Manitoba
Theatre companies in Manitoba
2023 disestablishments in Canada